Naxışnərgiz (also, Nakhyshnargiz, Nakishnarkiz and Nakhshi-Nargiz) is a village and municipality in the Babek District of Nakhchivan, Azerbaijan. It is located 15 km in the north-east from the district center, on the slope of the Zangezur ridge. There are secondary school, club and mosque in the village. It has a population of 518.

History
Until 5 October 1999, it was part of the Qahab village, since the same date it was created on the part of territory of the Qahab village and named as Naxışnərgiz.

References

Populated places in Babek District